Gaffney High School (GHS) is a public high school in Gaffney, South Carolina in the United States. It is part of the Cherokee County School District.

History 
The high school building was opened at its  campus in 2000 at a cost of $22 million. Faulty construction work led to the district suing the bonding company, architects and construction company. The district received a $10 million settlement, $6 million of it for replacing brickwork and $4 million for mediation and architectural fees.

In March 2007, the school board approved a plan to construct a "9th Grade Academy"; a separate building connected to the high school with a covered walkway. The new building will be used by freshman students, who numbered about 600 in the 2006–2007 school year, for classes and meals. School officials said the new building should relieve overcrowding on the campus, opened in 2001 with a designed maximum capacity of 2,000 students but with a 2006–2007 enrollment of about 2,100.

The school board also approved a new stadium for the school's Twin Lakes Road campus. The new stadium would replace the William K. Brumbach stadium, known locally as "the Reservation" and located at the former Gaffney High School site on East Frederick Street that is now home to Gaffney Middle School. On the home side of the current stadium, Gaffney's teams enter through a tunnel, described by the Spartanburg Herald-Journal as "a revered entrance for Gaffney teams."

The projected minimum cost of the stadium was $7.2 million, and another $1.5 million may be spent to build a new field track, more parking and a team meeting room, if school officials are able to get the money from contingency funds or if construction costs elsewhere come in under budget, according to a consultant for the school district.

Athletics 

Gaffney High School competes in the Class 5A Division of the South Carolina High School League.

State Championships

Football – 1927, 1928, 1929, 1931, 1934, 1960, 1961, 1963, 1964, 1965, 1985, 1992, 1997, 2003, 2005, 2006, 2012, 2021

Baseball – 2009

Basketball – 1949, 2003, 2004, 2005, 2010, 2012

Softball – 2009

Boys Golf – 2003, 2018

Volleyball – 1982

Boys Cross Country – 1976

Notable alumni 
 Cornelius Bonner, Arena Football League (AFL) player
 Quinshad Davis, National Football League (NFL) player
 Denzelle Good, NFL player
 Jeff Littlejohn, AFL player
 Rocky McIntosh, NFL player
 L. J. Peak, National Basketball Association (NBA) G League player
 Arizona Reid, Israeli National League basketball player
 Sidney Rice, NFL player
 Dominique Stevenson, NFL player
 Andie MacDowell, Actress
 Ann Gordon McCrory, First Lady of North Carolina
 Michael McCluney, Singer (Day 26)
 Charlie Blackwell-Thompson, NASA engineer and launch director

References

External links 
 

Gaffney, South Carolina
Schools in Cherokee County, South Carolina
Public high schools in South Carolina